Green & Green is a California based law firm founded in 1980. The firm specializes in business, intellectual property, real estate, and entertainment law.

References

External links

Law firms based in California